20 Greatest Hits (subtitled The Tenth Anniversary Album) is a 1975 compilation album by Tom Jones. As the subtitle suggests, it had been ten years since Jones' first hit, "It's Not Unusual" in 1965. With a copyright date of 1974, the album was released in the UK on 28 February 1975. It reached No.1 on the charts in March for four consecutive weeks and was certified Gold, becoming his biggest album to that point.

Half of the album's 20 tracks were top 10 hits, including two number ones.

Track listing 
Side one
 "It's Not Unusual" (1.58)
 "Only Once" (4.07)
 "I'll Never Fall in Love Again" (4.11)
 "Somethin' 'Bout You Baby I Like" (3.29)
 "What's New Pussycat" (2.03) 
Side two
 "Till" (2.16)
 "Runnin' Bear" (3.37)
 "Green Green Grass of Home" (3.02)
 "Thunderball" (2.50)
 "Love Me Tonight" (3.11)
Side three
 "She's a Lady" (2.53)
 "Pledging My Love" (2.50)
 "Funny Familiar Forgotten Feelings" (2.55)
 "With These Hands" (2.42)
 "Delilah" (3.21)
Side four
 "I'm Coming Home" (3.07)
 "To Make a Big Man Cry" (2.45)
 "Help Yourself" (2.53)
 "The Sun Died" (3.29)
 "Daughter of Darkness" (3.15)

Charts

Weekly charts

Year-end charts

Certifications and sales

References 

1975 compilation albums
Tom Jones (singer) albums